Andares is a shopping mall in Zapopan, Mexico, in the Guadalajara metropolitan area.  This outdoor and indoor shopping center is located in the heart of the city.  It opened on November 19, 2008. Anchors are Palacio de Hierro and Liverpool. The project was developed by DMI (Desarrolladora Mexicana de Inmuebles). Andares is one of the biggest mixed-use projects in Latin America, composed by multiple retail areas, 4 office buildings, 2 residential buildings and a hotel.

External links 
 Andares Luxury

Zapopan
Shopping malls established in 2008
Shopping malls in Guadalajara
Tourist attractions in Jalisco
2008 establishments in Mexico